is a Japanese musical arranger and keyboardist in distributors Being Inc., mainly in their label Giza Studio. In years 1999-2013 he was part of Japanese band Garnet Crow as arranger. In March 2018, he launched his own band project Again, however in June 2019 changed into Alpha under independent label Freestyle.

List of provided works as arranger
★ album ☆ single/coupling

Miho Komatsu  
 Nazo ☆
 Kagayakeru Hoshi ☆
 Alive, My Soul (Nazo) ★
Negai Goto Hitotsu Dake ☆
Koori no ue ni Tatsu yo ni ☆
Chance ☆
Anybody's Game ☆
Miho Komatsu 2nd ~ Mirai ~ ★
Sayonara no Kakera ☆
Saitan Kyori de ☆
Kaze ga Soyogu Basho ☆
No Time No Fall, Holding; Holding on (Miho Komatsu 3rd ~ everywhere ~) ★
Style of my own (Miho Komatsu 5 ~ source ~) ★
Ashita wo Motezuni (Miho Komatsu 6th ~ Hanano ~) ★
Tsubasa wa Nakutemo ☆
Suna no Shiro ☆
Namida Kirare Tobase ☆
I~Dareka... ☆
Kokyou (Miho Komatsu 7 ~prime number~) ★
Anata Iro ☆
Aoi Natsu, Anata no Te (Miho Komatsu 8 ~a piece of cake~)★
Happy ending (Miho Komatsu Best ~once more~) ★

Zard
I can't let go
Atarashii Door ~Fuyu no Himawari~ ☆
Wake Up Make The Morning Last ~Wasuregataki Hito he~, I Feel Fine Yeah (Eien) ★
Mind Games ☆
Sekai wa Kitto Mirai no Naka ☆
Kono Namida Hoshi ni Nare ☆
Omohide (Toki no Tsubasa) ★
Separate Ways (Kimi to no Distance) ★

Deen
Koi ga Totsuzen Yomigaeru, Eien wo Azuketekure, Keep On Dancin' (as composer) (Deen) ★
Hitori ja Nai ☆
Sunshine On Summer Time ☆
Kimi no Kokoro ni Kaeritai, Shounen (I wish)
Mirai no Tameni ☆
Tooi Toori Mirai de ☆
Tooi ni Yuku yo (The Day) ★
Mou Nakanaide ☆
Kioku no Kage ☆
Kimi he no Parade ☆
Kizuna (Parade) ★

Manish
It's so Natural ☆
Iranai, Kaze, Setsunai Jiyuu, Kimagurena Sora, Sayonara Lazy Days, Mabushii Kurai ni (Cheer!) ★

Keiko Utoku
Wooo Baby ☆

Arisa Tsujio
 Aoi Sora ni Deata ☆
 Natsu no Nioi ☆

Rumania Montevideo 
(along with Makoto Miyoshi)
 Jet Plane ★
 Sunny,Cloudy,Rain ★
 Still for your love ☆
 Rumaniamania ★
 Digital Music Power ☆
 Picnic ☆
 Koisuru Betty ☆
 Girl, Girl, Boy, Girl, Boy ★
 Start All Over Again ☆
 Hard Rain ☆
 Tender Rain ☆
 Mo' Better Tracks ★

Grass Arcade
 Brave ☆
 Butterfly ☆

Sweet Velvet
 I Just Feel So Love Again ☆
 Flame of love ☆
 Lazy Drive ☆
 Stay (I Just Feel So "Sweet") ★

WAG
 Free Magic ☆

Mai Kuraki
What I feel

Chika Yoshida
Danna san he -Higoro no Kansha wo Komete- ★ (Yoshida Chika -12 no Hana-)
Tsuki ni Inori wo ☆

The Tambourines
 Easy Game ☆
 Yesterday is over ☆
 Mayonaka ni Kizuita Funny Love ☆
 Hijack brandnew days ☆
 Call me, call me ☆
 Love Flower, Star, My back pages (My Back Pages) ★
 Flash back (Dizzy Season) ★
 Blue blue rain ☆

Shiori Takei
 Atarashii Kisetsu (My Favorite Things) ★
 Puzzle (Second tune ~Sekai Tomete~) ★

Rina Aiuchi
 Miss you (Playgirl)★
 Natsu no Maboroshi (Thanx)★
 Hands ☆

Sayuri Iwata
 Sorairo no Neko ☆

Miki Matsuhashi
 Secret Place, Peaceful night (Destiny) ★

Azumi Uehara
 Solitude ☆

Aiko Kitahara
 Hands up!! (Message) ★
 Mou Kokoro Yuretarishinaide ☆
 Sono Egayo yo Eien ni ☆
 Koi no Inryoku ☆

Marie Ueda
 Senkai Jumon (Sentimental Rhythm) ★

Renka
 Rebirth ☆
 Melody of Memory ☆

Ai Takaoka
 You Gone ☆

U-ka Saegusa in db
 Kimi no Ai ni Tsutsumarete Itai ☆
 Ai no Wana ☆
 Everybody Jump ☆
 Fall in love ☆
 Natsu no Photograph, Ai Kotoba (U-ka saegusa IN db III) ★

Discography
Imagination (digital release)

See also
Garnet Crow discography

References

External links

Profile from Official Garnet Crow website 

Being Inc. artists
Japanese music arrangers
Living people
Garnet Crow
1967 births